Ye or Yeh the Great was a figure in Chinese mythology. 

In the Records of the Grand Historian, Sima Qian's account of the origin of the House of Ying made him the son of Lady Xiu and the egg of a black bird. He was said to have been the father of Fei the Great, who later became known as Boyi, by the Lady Hua.

Some Chinese scholars have argued that his name was a title or epithet of Gao Yao, who served under Emperor Shun and was counted as the ancestor of some Li and Zhou families.

Sources 

Characters in Chinese mythology
Qin (state)

Legendary progenitors